The New York City Police Department Intelligence Bureau is a division of the New York City Police Department (NYPD) which claims responsibility for the detection and disruption of criminal and terrorist activity through the use of intelligence-led policing. There is limited oversight over the Intelligence Bureau, and it conducts work in secrecy without the city council being informed of operations.

The intelligence and counterterrorism bureaus fall under the domain of Intelligence and Counterterrorism Division, which is commanded by Deputy Commissioner John Miller.

Current subdivisions

Intelligence Operations and Analysis Section (IOAS) 
The IOAS is responsible for both collecting and analyzing data for counter-terrorism purposes.

Criminal Intelligence Section (CIS) 
Similar to the IOAS, the CIS collects and analyzes data for counter-crime purposes. They also conduct the Field Intelligence Officer (FIO) program, where officers conduct intelligence work with narcotics, firearms, and other criminal investigations.

International Liaison Program (ILP) 
The International Liaison Program places NYPD intelligence officers in existing law enforcement agencies around the globe. It was created in 2003 with the intention of counter-terrorism operations and has since found utility in investigating criminal cases that have international elements. The program is externally funded by the New York City Police Foundation. ILP has received criticism for its lack of government oversight, justification, and proper handling of intelligence. Currently, it has officers in 16 cities outside of New York.

Former subdivisions

Demographics / Zone Assessment Unit  
The Demographics Unit (later known as the Zone Assessment Unit) was a secret police intelligence division formed after the September 11 attacks to surveil Muslim-Americans. Police Spokespersons did not publicly acknowledge the unit until after the Associated Press revealed the organization through a Pulitzer Prize award-winning series of articles.

The unit's techniques included eavesdropping on conversations held in public locations, gaining access to internet usage by Muslim groups on college campuses by claiming to be investigating narcotics or gang activity, and labeling entire mosques as terror groups in order to record sermons and spy on religious officials without specific evidence of criminal wrongdoing.

Twenty-eight "ancestries of interest were monitored by the unit, ranging from Arab ethnicities like Palestinian and Syrian to heavily Muslim populations from former Soviet states such as Chechnya and Uzbekistan to Black American Muslims". It was noted by the ACLU that the NYPD "expressly excluded from its surveillance and mapping activities non-Muslims such as Coptic Christian Egyptians or Iranian Jews".

In 2013, the Muslim American Civil Liberties Coalition (MACLC), along with Creating Law Enforcement Accountability & Responsibility (CLEAR) and Asian American Legal Defense and Education Fund (AALDEF) published a report that was critical of NYPD surveillance of their communities, and the Demographics Unit in particular. On April 15, 2014, the New York Times reported that the NYPD officially dismantled the Zone Assessment Unit. However, there is concern that the data gathered through the program is still being used today.

in August 2012, the Chief of the NYPD Intelligence Division, Lt. Paul Galati admitted during sworn testimony that in the six years of his tenure, the unit tasked with monitoring Muslim-American life that had not yielded a single criminal lead.

According to the NYPD, there were two specific instances where information from the Zone Assessment Unit was used. In the wake of the 2013 Boston bombing, NYPD deployed to areas inhabited by individuals from the Caucus region, which includes Chechens, both to ensure people in those neighborhoods were not victimized by retaliation and to ensure that the two perpetrators were not able to blend into the area. In another instance, after a leader of the Hazara community was killed by a Pakistan-based organization in Quetta, Pakistan, NYPD was able to respond in the Hazara community.

In 2018, the NYPD paid out a settlement to groups and persons that were surveilled and agreed to update their training and manuals and that it would not engage in surveillance predicated upon religion.

See also 

New York City Police Department Counterterrorism Bureau
Police surveillance in New York City
 Organization of the New York City Police Department

References 

Law enforcement in the New York metropolitan area
Intelligence Bureau